The Ambassador of Malaysia to Romania is the head of Malaysia's diplomatic mission to Romania. The position has the rank and status of an Ambassador Extraordinary and Plenipotentiary and is based in the Embassy of Malaysia, Bucharest.

List of heads of mission

Ambassadors to Romania

See also
 Malaysia–Romania relations

References 

 
Romania
Malaysia